Lidiya Anatoliyivna Taran (born September 19, 1977) is a Ukrainian television presenter. She speaks English.

Early life
Taran was born in Kyiv, in a family of journalists.

Career
She began her journalistic career in radio, but television has made her a real star. In addition to her main profession, Taran is also successfully engaged in her social project, "To Realize a Dream", whose goal is to realize the dreams of seriously ill children in Ukraine.

1994–1995 - host of information and entertainment programs of radio “ Promin ”, “Dovira”.
1995–1998 - Editor and presenter of programs on several radio stations.
1998–2004 - presenter on the New Channel (Reporter, Sport Reporter, Rise , Goal)
2005-2009 - presenter on Channel 5 (News Time)
since 2009 - presenter on the channel "1 + 1" ( "I love Ukraine" , "Breakfast with 1 + 1" , "TSN" ) and 2 + 2 (" ProFootball ")
Taran also participated in the third season of the project "I Dance for You".

Personal life
Until August 2010, Taran was married to the presenter Andriy Domanskyi, with whom she has a daughter Vasilyna.

References

1977 births
Living people
Television presenters from Kyiv
1+1 (TV channel) people
5 Kanal people